Wuolijoki is a Finnish surname. Notable people with the surname include:

Hella Wuolijoki (1886–1954), Estonian writer
Juha Wuolijoki, Finnish producer and director
Wäinö Wuolijoki (1872–1947), Finnish politician

See also:
Vuolijoki, former municipality of Finland, now part of Kajaani

Finnish-language surnames